Chief Justice of Indonesia may refer to:

 Deputy Chief Justice of the Supreme Court Indonesia
 Deputy Chief Justice of the Constitutional Court of Indonesia